Collinstown Park Community College is a school in Clondalkin, South Dublin in Ireland. The college offers further education courses, including Post Leaving Certificates. It was established in 1984.

See also
 Education in Ireland
 List of further education colleges in Ireland

References

External links
 Collinstown Park Community College Official website
 Profile on QualifaX, Ireland's National Learners' Database.

Further education colleges in South Dublin (county)
Clondalkin